is a Japanese manga artist, illustrator, and musician. He is noted for his early career in gay manga, as the lead singer of the kayōkyoku group Tomari, and for his 2013 award-winning manga series .

Biography
Yamada was born in 1972 in Toyonaka, Osaka Prefecture. He began drawing manga in the fourth grade, and developed an interest the history of post-occupation Japan before studying at the Osaka University of Arts.

In 1991, Yamada made his debut as a manga artist, writing and illustrating a dōjinshi about comfort women. In 1994, he began to publish professionally as a gay manga artist, appearing in the gay interest magazines  and Samson. Yamada would become a regular contributor to both magazines, and was the exclusive cover illustrator for Samson in 2005. In 2010, Yamada contributed artwork to "FACE TO REAL", an art series organized to raise awareness of HIV/AIDS in Japan.

Areyo Hoshikuzu, Yamada's first long-form manga series created for a general audience, was serialized in Comic Beam from 2013 to 2018. The series, which follows two veterans of the Imperial Japanese Army in the aftermath of World War II, received widespread critical acclaim, winning a Tezuka Osamu Cultural Prize and the Grand Prize at the Japan Cartoonists Association Awards.

In 2015, his manga series Nippon Night Pillow began serialization in Comic Beam.

In addition to his manga work, Yamada is a kayōkyoku musician. He is the lead singer of the musical duo Tomari, with Atsuhiko Takemura.

References

External links
 Official website

1972 births
Living people
Manga artists from Osaka Prefecture
21st-century Japanese male musicians
Musicians from Osaka
LGBT comics creators
Japanese gay writers
Japanese gay artists
Japanese gay musicians
Winner of Tezuka Osamu Cultural Prize (New Artist Prize)